The Herschel family is a famous Anglo-German family of astronomers who lived from the 18th to the 20th century.
The family originated from Pirna in Saxony which lies near Dresden.

Notable people in this family include:
 William Herschel (1738–1822), astronomer and composer, discoverer of Uranus
 Caroline Herschel (1750–1848), astronomer and singer, sister of Sir William Herschel
 John Herschel (1792–1871), mathematician and astronomer, son of Sir William Herschel
 Alexander Stewart Herschel (1836–1907), astronomer, grandson of Sir William Herschel
 William James Herschel (1833–1917), Pioneer of fingerprinting, grandson of Sir William Herschel
 John Herschel the Younger (1837–1921), grandson of Sir William Herschel

References

 
Scientific families
English families
British families of German ancestry
German families
People from Buckinghamshire
People from Berkshire
People from Saxony
People from Pirna